Cloverdale is an unincorporated community in Lane County, Oregon, United States.

Cloverdale was the site of one of the first sawmills in Lane County, built in 1851. A gristmill was added in 1852. A townsite was laid out at Cloverdale in 1855, but the plat was later canceled. Cloverdale was considered a "thing of the past" as early as 1884. At one time Cloverdale had a store, and a school, and a blacksmith forge. The former Cloverdale Methodist Episcopal Church now serves as a wedding chapel. The church was built in 1904, and later served Baptist and Mennonite congregations and then as a community hall. The building was purchased by the McKinlay family in 1999 and restored. The school building, constructed in 1911, is also still standing.

References

External links
April 2010 story about Cloverdale church in The Register-Guard
Image of Cloverdale chapel from Flickr

Unincorporated communities in Lane County, Oregon
1855 establishments in Oregon Territory
Unincorporated communities in Oregon
Populated places established in 1855